Vasil Katsadze (born Potsdam, 16 July 1976) is a Georgian rugby union and rugby league player. He played as a wing and as a flanker in rugby union.

Katsadze moved to France, where he played in AS Béziers (1999/2000), FCS Rumilly (2000/01), FC Grenoble (2001/02), SC Albi (2004/05-2005/06) and Villefranche XIII Aveyron.

He had 34 caps for Georgia, scoring 8 tries, 40 points on aggregate. He had his first game at the 29-23 win over Poland, at 10 May 1997, in Sopot, for the FIRA Championship. He was called for the 2003 Rugby World Cup, playing in all the four games, two of them as the captain and one of them as a substitute, but without scoring. He had his last game at the 65-0 win over Ukraine, at 26 February 2005, in Tbilisi, for the Six Nations B, scoring a try. He soon would change codes for rugby league, so this would be his last rugby union international game, aged only 28 years old.

He went to play rugby league for UVC-13, in France, since 2006/07.

References

External links
Vasil Katsadze International Statistics

1976 births
Living people
Rugby union players from Georgia (country)
Rugby league players from Georgia (country)
Rugby union wings
Rugby union flankers
Georgia international rugby union players
Expatriate sportspeople from Georgia (country) in France
Villefranche XIII Aveyron players